Terje Søviknes (born 28 February 1969) is a Norwegian politician for the Progress Party who has served as the Minister of Petroleum and Energy from December 2016 to August 2018. From December 2019 to January 2020 he served as the Minister of the Elderly and Public Health. He also serves as the party's second deputy leader since 2019, a post he previously held from 1999 to 2001. 

Søviknes was the first politician of his party to become mayor of a Norwegian municipality, namely Os, Hordaland in 1999, and one of the longest-serving, retaining the position for five consecutive elections until his 2016 government appointment.

Early life and education
Søviknes was born in Os, Norway to metalworker and fisherman Eirik Søviknes (born 1939) and store clerk Gunn Drange (born 1942). He grew up on Søvikneset in Lysefjorden.  He attended Os Senior high school from 1985 to 1988. He earned a degree in marine engineering from Bergen College of Engineering in 1992, and later studied at the Norwegian School of Economics.

Political career

Early career and sex scandal
From 1999 to 2001, Søviknes was the second deputy leader of the Progress Party together with Siv Jensen, and was considered as a possible successor to Carl I. Hagen as leader of the party. He however became controversial after an incident at a party congress in 2001 where he had sexually abused a 16-year-old intoxicated member of the Youth of the Progress Party. Søviknes retained his position as mayor of Os (since 1999) and did not lose his local support after the incident.

Mayor of Os
After first being elected mayor following the 1999 local elections, his local party's support subsequently surged from 36.6 to 45.7% (the highest share of votes for the party in a municipality for the election) in the 2003 local elections. The success was repeated in the 2007 local elections when he was reelected by a landslide. The candidate from the Conservative Party who came in second, jokingly commented that "You don't challenge Terje Søviknes in Os." 
He was yet again reelected in the 2011 local elections, this time however by a far lesser margin. This led to speculation that he could be ousted from power by a coalition of the other parties. Søviknes remained in power with the support of the Conservative party.

Os has since by himself and the media been seen as a showcase municipality for the Progress Party. This is as he in his first term as mayor achieved full kindergarten coverage, full nursing home coverage and started a program of well-being and health journeys to Spain and related locations. It was also established a "full" stop of immigration and a local Vinmonopol store. Successful in being consecutively elected as mayor from 2003 to 2007, in this term the main issues was development of the city centre, better drug addiction recovery programs, development of schools and construction of a waterpark. While the municipality was struggling with large deficits before Søviknes became mayor, this has since been turned into a significant surplus as of 2004. His successful career as mayor of Os has gained him the nickname the "Wizard of Os" by the media.

Minister of Petroleum and Energy
On 20 December 2016, Søviknes was appointed Minister of Petroleum and Energy in the Solberg Cabinet, succeeding fellow party member Tord Lien. 

In October 2017, he was found to have misinformed the Storting about a controversial petroleum project's finalisation date. The project was scheduled to be finished in 2022, three years after what Søviknes had previously stated. 

He resigned in late August 2018 citing family reasons, and instead returned to become mayor of Os, a position he held for a year until Os was merged with Fusa to become Bjørnafjorden municipality in 2020.

Minister of the Elderly and Public Health
In December 2019, Erna Solberg commenced a reshuffle where she appointed Søviknes to become Minister of the Elderly and Public Health succeeding fellow party member Sylvi Listhaug, who had been appointed as Minister of Petroleum and Energy. Like Listhaug, his term was cut short after a month when the Progress Party withdrew from the government, citing conflict within the government about bringing an ISIS associated woman and her sick children home.

Second term as deputy leader
Søviknes was re-elected as the party's second deputy leader at the party congress on 5 May 2019, succeeding Ketil Solvik-Olsen who didn't stand for re-election citing family reasons. In 2021, following Siv Jensen's announced departure as party leader, Søviknes said he was open to continue as second deputy leader if Listhaug was elected her successor. Listhaug was subsequently elected party leader at the party convention, with Ketil Solvik-Olsen as first deputy leader, while Søviknes was re-elected as second deputy.

Personal life
Søviknes married his first wife, Janniche Askeland in 1998 and they have two children together. In October 2011 they announced that they were separating. Søviknes is an avid bridge enthusiast and former president of the Os Bridge Club.

Awards
Zero Emission Resource Organisation's Local climate measure of the year : 2011 
Norwegian Lifesaving Society's Badge of Honour: 1993

References

1969 births
Living people
Mayors of places in Hordaland
Progress Party (Norway) politicians
People from Os, Hordaland
Deputy members of the Storting
Place of birth missing (living people)
Norwegian contract bridge players
Norwegian School of Economics alumni
Bergen University College alumni
Petroleum and energy ministers of Norway